Naughty Boys & Soldiers is a 1996 Taiwanese comedy film directed by Kevin Chu and written by Kuo Cheng, set in a 1970s coastal town with a primary school and a military base. While most of the comedy is slapstick zaniness, the film also pokes fun at the many absurdities in Taiwan's White Terror period, such as schools encouraging children to idolize Chiang Kai-shek and regurgitate his anti-Communist rhetoric.

Cast
Nicky Wu
Yvonne Yung
Jacky Wu
Steven Hao

Theme song
"Hudie Fei Ya" (蝴蝶飛呀; "Fly, Butterfly") performed by Xiao Hu Dui

External links

1990s Mandarin-language films
Hokkien-language films
Films directed by Kevin Chu
Films with screenplays by Kuo Cheng
Films shot in Taiwan
Films set in Taiwan
Taiwanese comedy films
1996 comedy films
1996 films
Films set in the 1970s
Cultural depictions of Chiang Kai-shek